Charles Kramer (April 18, 1879 – January 20, 1943) was an attorney and politician from Los Angeles, California.  A member of the Democratic Party, he was most notable for his service as a member of the United States House of Representatives, an office he held for five terms between 1933 and 1943.

Early life
Kramer was born in Paducah, Kentucky, and his family moved to Chicago during his infancy. He attended Chicago's public and parochial schools, and attended and De Paul University and the Illinois College of Law. He was admitted to the bar in 1904 and began practice in Chicago. He was the director of a dress manufacturing concern.

Kramer moved to Los Angeles, in 1920 and engaged in the practice of law. He was also active in civic and fraternal organizations, including the Elks, Moose, and Knights of Columbus.

Congress 
He was elected as a Democrat to the Seventy-third and to the four succeeding Congresses (March 4, 1933 – January 3, 1943). He chaired the House Committee on Patents (Seventy-sixth and Seventy-seventh Congresses). He was an unsuccessful candidate for the Democratic nomination for Mayor of Los Angeles in 1941 and an unsuccessful candidate for reelection in 1942 to the Seventy-eighth Congress.

Death
Kramer was ill during his final term in Congress.  He died in Los Angeles on January 20, 1943, less than three weeks after his final term expired.  Kramer was entombed at Calvary Cemetery.

Family
In 1900, Kramer married Martha Dremke of Chicago in St. Joseph, Michigan.  They were the parents of a son and two daughters - Elsie (1901-1998) (Mrs. Fred W. Schaarmann), Arthur C. (1906-1979), and Ethel (1919-1969) (Mrs. Frank E. Mauritz).

References

1879 births
1943 deaths
Democratic Party members of the United States House of Representatives from California
DePaul University alumni
University of Illinois College of Law alumni
Burials at Calvary Cemetery (Los Angeles)